Bernt Nikolai Hulsker (born 9 September 1977) is a retired Norwegian footballer as well as author, comedian, radio host, and betting ambassador. He was born in Den Haag, but grew up in Vestnes, Norway.

Media career
Hulsker participates in the football program "Foppall" on VGTV. He also has his own footballpodcast on iTunes "Foppall with Bernt Hulsker", that immediately after release ended up on the  iTunes leaderboard in Norway and stayed there ever since.

He became the center of media attention when in 2015, during the broadcast of draw for the UEFA Euro 2016 qualifying play-offs, upon Norway being paired with Hungary, he exclaimed "Drømlottning!" ("Dream pick!") while pounding the desk. Norway would lose both playoff matches, and at the start of the tournament, Hulsker publicly apologized to Hungary through ambassador Anna Sikó and pledged to support the Hungarian team.

Career statistics
Sources:

References

1977 births
Living people
People from Vestnes
Norwegian footballers
SK Træff players
Molde FK players
Vålerenga Fotball players
AIK Fotboll players
IK Start players
Stabæk Fotball players
Eliteserien players
Norwegian First Division players
Allsvenskan players
Norwegian expatriate footballers
Expatriate footballers in Sweden
Norwegian expatriate sportspeople in Sweden
Association football forwards
Sportspeople from Møre og Romsdal